Oliver Davies was a 19th-century Welsh harpist. He was born in Montgomery. Whilst still a young musician he performed at the Royal Cambrian Institution (May 1822) and as principal harpist at the Welshpool Eisteddfod (1824) and the Cymmrodorion Eisteddfod in London (May 1829).

References 

People from Powys
Welsh harpists
19th-century Welsh people